Louis Lavoie (1905 – 1 August 1947) was a Canadian boxer. He competed in the men's middleweight event at the 1932 Summer Olympics. At the 1932 Summer Olympics, he lost to Roger Michelot of France.

References

1905 births
1947 deaths
Canadian male boxers
Olympic boxers of Canada
Boxers at the 1932 Summer Olympics
Place of birth missing
Middleweight boxers